The Shire of Mildura was a local government area located at the northwestern corner of Victoria, Australia, on the Murray River and the South Australian border. From 1920 onwards, Mildura itself was managed by a separate entity, ultimately known as the City of Mildura.

History

Mildura was part of the Swan Hill Road District, which initially covered most of northwestern Victoria. Swan Hill was incorporated on 8 July 1862, and became a shire on 14 August 1871. On 10 January 1890, the Shire of Mildura was incorporated, from part of its Lower Murray Riding.

A new shire, Walpeup, was formed in western Victoria on 1 October 1911, taking in some southern areas of Mildura and sections of five other shires. A small part of the shire, in and near Mildura, was severed on 18 May 1920, and incorporated as a borough, which became the City of Mildura on 21 March 1934. Parts of the Sandilong and Lake Ridings were annexed to the city on 1 October 1971.

On 20 January 1995, the Shire of Mildura was abolished, and along with the City of Mildura and the Shire of Walpeup, was merged into the newly created Rural City of Mildura.

Wards

The Shire of Mildura was divided into three ridings, each of which elected three councillors:
 Koorlong Riding
 Lake Riding
 Sandilong Riding

Towns and localities

* Council seat.

Population

* Estimate in the 1958 Victorian Year Book.

References

External links
 Victorian Places - Mildura Shire

Mildura Shire
1890 establishments in Australia
Mildura